The Gibraltar Football League is the only senior tier of association football in Gibraltar, founded in 2019 as the Gibraltar National League after a merger of the Gibraltar Premier Division, which served as the top division of football on the Rock since 1905, and the Gibraltar Second Division, which had existed since 1909. It was announced in August 2019 by the Gibraltar Football Association. The league is supported by the Gibraltar Intermediate League for U23 sides and Hound Dogs.

Format
Rumours of the new league began in 2018, when the Gibraltar FA announced plans for a single tier format in its league constitution for the 2018–19 Gibraltar Premier Division. On 1 August 2019, the GFA confirmed details of the restructure of domestic football in Gibraltar, and the format of the new 16 team league. After 4 teams left the league, the remaining 12 teams are to follow the same league format. Teams will play one round of games as a single league, before splitting into two groups: the Championship Group contested by the top 6 sides, and the Challenge Group between the bottom 6 sides. The winners of the Challenge Group will receive the GFA Challenge Trophy and receive a bye to the second round of the next season's Rock Cup. Hound Dogs, who participated in the final season of the Gibraltar Second Division, were granted special dispensation to compete in the Gibraltar Intermediate League.

The first season of the Gibraltar National League had no champion, as the season was declared null and void by the Gibraltar FA as a result of the COVID-19 pandemic.

In 2021, the Gibraltar FA announced that every game of the 2021–22 Gibraltar National League season would be streamed online through a broadcasting deal with Footters.

In July 2022, the league rebranded as the Gibraltar Football League, with a new identity and logo.

Teams
Of the 17 teams that formed the initial league, 3 founder teams withdrew before the inaugural season started: Gibraltar Phoenix, Gibraltar United, and Leo. Additionally, Olympique 13 were expelled from the league after forfeiting the first two matches of the 2019-20 season. Hound Dogs, while a founding member, opted not to join the National League, instead competing in the Gibraltar Intermediate League for financial reasons. In December 2020, Boca Gibraltar were also expelled from the league. As such, the following 11 teams currently contest the competition. 

Bruno's Magpies
College 1975
Europa FC
Europa Point
Glacis United
Lincoln Red Imps
Lions Gibraltar
Lynx
Manchester 62
Mons Calpe
St Joseph's

List of winners
Table includes top three of the Championship Group (top half of table) and Challenge Group (bottom half of table)

See also
 Gibraltar Premier Division

References

External links

Gibraltar FA Website
Gibraltar - List of Champions, RSSSF.com

 
1
Top level football leagues in Europe
2019 establishments in Gibraltar
Sports leagues established in 2019